Čento is a neighbourhood in the City of Skopje, North Macedonia, administered by the Gazi Baba Municipality. The neighbourhood is named after Macedonian politician Metodija Andonov-Čento.

Demographics
According to the 2002 census, the town had a total of 23,915 inhabitants. Ethnic groups in the town include:
Macedonians 12.499
Albanians  8.818
Romani 891
Serbs 657
Bosniaks 407
Turks 316 
Vlachs 83
Others 244

Sports
The local football club KF Fortuna 1975 plays in the Macedonian Third Football League.

References

External links

Gazi Baba Municipality
Neighbourhoods in Gazi Baba Municipality
Neighbourhoods of Skopje
Albanian communities in North Macedonia